The Grand Hotel Tripoli, also known as Funduq-Al-Kabir Hotel in Arabic, is a hotel on El-Fatah Street in Tripoli, Libya.

Data

The modern hotel was built in 1982 and designed by the British firm of Wakeman Trower & Partners Ltd. 

It replaced the smaller historic hotel originally built by the Italians in 1927 in "Neomoresco style", and that was also called Grand Hotel Tripoli, which was heavily damaged by bombings in 1942 and was demolished after WW2.
After the February 17th Civil war, the grand hotel now remains abandoned and closed as of 2018.

The Original hotel stands in an extensive open park which overlooks the then unfilled Tripoli harbor, not far from the Algerian embassy and Tripoli Cathedral - Jamal Abdul Nasser Mosque. It has 350 rooms. It is noted for its many arches, inspired by the original building's facade, which form the basis of the structure.  The hotel once had a propaganda poster on the outside of the hotel that showed a crying child superimposed above a montage of the wreckage caused by the attack by the British.

Historic Importance 

The Original Grand Hotel of Tripoli, dating back to as early as 1920, appears to be included within a photo taken with Italian General Italo Gariboldi welcoming Erwin Rommel and Johannes Streich on February 12, 1941.

Erwin Rommel was selected by Adolf Hitler to lead the newly formed Afrika Korps divisions in the fight against British forces in North Africa. Two days later, his troops arrived in Tripoli. 

Several days later, his troops staged a parade in the 'Suq-Al-Khubsa' plaza, now known as Martyrs square where he multiplied the number of his forces by ordering his tanks and infantry to circle the square multiple times, to boost morale and falsify numbers to any British spies. 

Erwin Rommel with his Afrika Korps and with the Italian Army then expelled the British 8th Army out of Libya, and eventually led his forces into Egypt during the North Africa campaign that lasted for 3 years earning him the famed title "The Desert Fox".

References

External links
the "Grand Hotel" in Italian Tripoli

Hotels in Tripoli, Libya
Hotel buildings completed in 1982
Defunct hotels